Emilio Joseph "Zeke" Sinicola (January 25, 1929 – June 6, 2011) was an American professional basketball player. He played on the collegiate level at Niagara University and was an NCAA Men's Basketball All-American. In the early 1950s he played for the Fort Wayne Pistons of the National Basketball Association.

References

1929 births
2011 deaths
Basketball players from New York City
Fort Wayne Pistons draft picks
Fort Wayne Pistons players
Guards (basketball)
Niagara Purple Eagles men's basketball players
People from East Harlem
Sportspeople from Manhattan
American men's basketball players